Ascochyta prasadii is a plant pathogen that causes leaf spot and stem cankers on hemp.

See also
List of Ascochyta species

References

External links

Fungal plant pathogens and diseases
Eudicot diseases
prasadii
Fungi described in 1968